James John Wilson Carmichael (9 June 1800 – 1868), also known as John Carmichael was a British marine painter.

Life
Carmichael was born at the Ouseburn, in Newcastle upon Tyne, Northumberland, on 9 June 1800, the son of William Carmichael, a ship's carpenter. He went to sea at an early age, and spent three years on board a vessel sailing between ports in Spain and Portugal. On his return, he was apprenticed to a shipbuilding firm. After completing his apprenticeship, he devoted all his spare time to art, and eventually gave up the carpentry business, setting himself up as a drawing-master and miniature painter. His first historical painting to attract public notice was the Fight Between the Shannon and Chesapeake, which sold for 13 guineas (£13.65). He then painted The Bombardment of Algiers for Trinity House, Newcastle, for which he received 40 guineas; it is still at Trinity House, along with The Heroic Exploits of Admiral Lord Collingwood in HMS "Excellent" at the Battle of Cape St. Vincent, painted in collaboration with George Balmer.  Another important early commission was for a View of Newcastle for which the city corporation paid him 100 guineas. During the redevelopment of the centre of Newcastle, Carmichael worked with the architect John Dobson to produce some joint works, including paintings with designs for the Central Station and the Grainger Market. He also collaborated with John Blackmore to produce an illustrated book: Views on the Newcastle and Carlisle Railway in 1836.

His name first appears as an exhibitor in 1838, when he contributed an oil painting, Shipping in the Bay of Naples, to the Society of British Artists. He showed both oil paintings and watercolours at the Royal Academy, his contributions including The Conqueror towing the Africa off the Shoals of Trafalgar (1841) and The Arrival of the Royal Squadron (1843).

He lived in Newcastle until about 1845, when he moved to London, where he was already known as a skilful marine painter. In 1855, during the Crimean War he was sent to the Baltic to make drawings for The Illustrated London News. His painting of the bombardment of Sveaborg, which he witnessed during this assignment, was exhibited at the Royal Academy and is now in the collection of the National Maritime Museum.

He later moved to Scarborough, where he died in 1868.

He published The Art of Marine Painting in Water-Colours in 1859, and The Art of Marine Painting in Oil-Colours in 1864.

His daughter Annie married William Luson Thomas son of a shipbroker and a successful artist who, exasperated by the treatment of artists by the Illustrated London News, founded in 1869 The Graphic newspaper which had immense influence within the art world.

References

Sources

External links

 
Biography from the National Maritime Museum

1800 births
1868 deaths
19th-century English painters
Artists from Newcastle upon Tyne
English male painters
British marine artists
19th-century English male artists